WBOR (91.1 FM) is a noncommercial, educational, and community public radio station licensed to Bowdoin College in Brunswick, Maine, United States. The station broadcasts from the basement of the Dudley Coe Building on the Bowdoin College campus. DJs are predominately full-time Bowdoin College students; however, many Bowdoin staff and faculty members, and community members host weekly shows. WBOR can be heard throughout the Mid Coast area and sometimes as far away as Portland.

History
At least as far back as March 1941, Bowdoin students and faculty have sporadically hosted programs recorded on campus and later broadcast through Portland's WCSH, Lewiston's WCOU, Augusta's WRDO, and Bangor's WLBZ. These programs usually consisted of play readings, faculty interviews, and live vocal music from the Bowdoin College Glee Club and the Meddiebempsters.

In the late 1940s, Bowdoin began a program entitled “Bowdoin-on-the-air” (BOTA), where students would record radio broadcasts, which Portland's WGAN would broadcast semi-regularly. In March of 1948, BOTA formed the Radio Drama Workshop to organize the writing, directing, and production of student radio dramas. 

In 1947, due to the popularity of BOTA, President Kenneth Sills formed a committee to look into the possibility of building an AM radio station on campus. After a $4,000 gift from the Class of 1924 is secured, the Bowdoin Orient offices on the second floor of Moulton Union (above the Lancaster lounge) are transformed into a radio station. The new studio opened in December of 1949. The station is equipped with an AM transmitter and a direct phone line to WGAN in Portland.

On April 25, 1948, BOTA broadcasts its first original radio drama created by the workshop. The drama, entitled “The Bowdoin Plan,” was written by Herbert L. Gould, class of 1950. The Bowdoin Orient lauds it as “the most ambitious thing yet attempted by the group.” A recording of the play is sent to all New England colleges with radio stations as an example of what a college station can accomplish.

At 10:15 pm on February 16, 1949, BOTA broadcasts a pre-recorded interview with Red Sox shortstop Johnny Pesky on WGAN.

On March 22, 1950, BOTA made the first test of their new AM transmitter. An experimental program of campus news and music is broadcast live at 7:45 pm on 820 AM. Due to the weakness of their AM signal, BOTA continues to broadcast through Portland's WGAN for another year.

In the Spring of 1950, Bowdoin-on-Air becomes a weekly fixture in WGAN's programming, airing every Sunday at 1:45 PM. Through a direct phone line, BOTA could broadcast on WGAN live from their new Moulton Union studio. The first live broadcast, a performance of William Butler Yeats' play, A Pot O' Broth, is aired on April 16, 1950. The following fall, programming is expanded to half an hour, with an additional “experimental” four-hour evening show featuring news, sports, interviews, dramatic skits, classical “music to study by,” and jazz “music not to study by.”

On March 16, 1951, delegates from BOTA traveled to Northampton, Massachusetts, to attend the Intercollegiate Radio Conference at Smith College. The conference is the first of its kind in the east.

At 7 pm on May 9, 1951, BOTA began officially broadcasting at 820 AM. In conjunction with the official switch, BOTA changes its name to WBOA (Bowdoin-on-Air), their official FCC station name.

In December of 1956, WBOA reregistered with the FCC as an FM station and was granted the broadcast frequency of 91.1 MHz. With the switch to FM, WBOA changes its name to WBOR (Bowdoin-on-Radio). On February 20, 1957, WBOR's first FM broadcast was heard across campus. Before this, WBOA could only be heard in freshmen dorms within a few hundred feet of the Moulton Union station.

On March 13, 1960, WBOR records a Pete Seeger concert at Bowdoin’s Pickard Theater. The Smithsonian Institution would later release the entire recording in a two-CD set and on streaming platforms. In the same year, WBOR interviewed actress Bette Davis on air.

On May 6, 1964, WBOR was put in charge of recording Martin Luther King's speech on the Bowdoin campus.

In 1968, WBOR began publishing a weekly music newsletter entitled “Turntable Rumble.” By spring of 1970, “Turntable Rumble” had disappeared altogether.

On October 5, 1969, WBOR broadcasts all-day coverage of Vietnam War moratorium activities.

On October 19, 1982, after a two-year battle with local radio and T.V. stations, the FCC gave WBOR the go-ahead to increase its signal strength to 300 watts.

A DJ spends a day broadcasting from the Coles Tower (then Senior Center) elevator, interviewing patrons. The spectacle is entitled ”Schriebers Big Shaft.”

On March 9, 1984, WBOR hosted a “Breakdance Showdown” between breakdance squads “The Bionic Brothers,” “Breakster's Express,” and “The M.M. Connection.”

In the fall of 1995, WBOR moved into a newly renovated space in the basement of the Dudley Coe building, where it has remained since.

In October of 2000, WBOR began broadcasting worldwide through an online stream.

In October 2001, The Bowdoin Orient began running a “DJ of the Week” column.

Starting in May of 2002, WBOR began continuous programming with its community members and a few Bowdoin students. Since then, WBOR has been on the air with a limited summer and break schedule with the help of overnight CDs and iTunes playlists.

In the fall of 2003, WBOR begins printing an untitled music and arts magazine. In 2004, after much deliberation, the publication was titled “FlipYourShit.” “FlipYourShit” is published regularly until the fall of 2006. After the famous “Save WBOR” fall 2006 issue, “FlipYourShit” goes on a largely unexplained two-year hiatus. In the fall of 2008, the WBOR magazine reappeared (with its former title “FlipYourShit” dropped) to rave reviews.

In the fall of 2006, WBOR comes under heavy fire from the FCC when attempting to renew its license due to gaps in the station record books. A “Save WBOR” campaign is mounted, and over 600 letters from students, faculty, alumni, and community members, including Senator Olympia Snowe, are sent to the FCC office to support WBOR, citing its prominent role in the Mid Coast Maine community. The FCC is swayed and decides to renew WBOR's license, letting the station off with a fine.

Event History
WBOR has a long history as a major event promoter for the Mid Coast Maine area. WBOR has hosted (and in some cases recorded) performances by:
 Pete Seeger (03/13/1960)
 Galaxie 500 (04/05/1991)
 The Magnetic Fields (04/09/199?)
 Spectrum (10/??/1993)
 Hypnolovewheel (10/??/1993)
 All About Chad (03/??/1994)
 Uncle Tupelo (03/??/1994)
 Philistines Jr (??/??/1996)
 Bedhead (??/??/1996)
 Fascination (??/??/1997)
 I Am the World Trade Center (04/03/2003)
 OK Go (02/20/2004)
 Rainer Maria (04/28/2004)
 The Secret Machines (01/29/2005)
 Moving Units (01/29/2005)
 Autolux (01/29/2005)
 The Hold Steady (03/31/2006)
 Oh No Oh My (09/08/2006)
 Bishop Allen (03/01/2007)
 The Sterns (03/30/2007)
 Suburban Kids with Biblical Names (04/04/2007)
 Dr. Dog (11/16/2007)
 The One AM Radio (04/12/2008)
 Broken Social Scene (10/25/2008)
 Wale (04/03/2009)
 Deerhunter (09/10/2009)
 The Morning Benders (11/??/2010)
 Lady Lamb (11/??/2010)
 Eli "Paperboy" Reed (02/??/2011)
 Local Natives (04/30/2011)
 Mac Miller (04/30/2011)
 Janelle Monae (04/30/2011)
 Surfer Blood (11/04/2011)
 Kreayshawn (11/04/2011)
 Taylor Eigsti (04/29/2012)
 Starscream (05/03/2012) 
 Magic Man (05/03/2012)
 RJD2 (11/02/2012)
 Shlomo (11/02/2012)
 Forget, Forget (11/04/2012)
 Cantilever (02/22/2012)
 The Antlers (02/22/2013)
 Chain Gang of 1974 (11/08/2013)
 MURS (03/28/2014)
 Wavves (10/18/2014)
 Sun Club (02/27/2015)
 Shabazz Palaces (2015/2016)
 Yale, Massachusetts (11/05/2016)
 Five of the Eyes (12/02/2016)
 Yonatan Gat (03/04/2017)
 deca (04/07/2017)
 Xenia Rubinos (09/23/2017)
 Kemba (10/21/2017)
 Crumb (11/11/2017)
 Duckwrth (02/18/2018)
 Julie Byrne (04/06/2018)
 Milo / R.A.P. Ferreira (10/26/2018)
 Dear Nora (11/30/2018)
 MAKU (02/01/2019)
 Squirrel Flower (02/09/2019)
 Plains (03/02/2019)
 Stereo After Hours (05/03/2019)
 Little Wings (10/05/2019)
 Honey Bun (11/22/2019)
 Melt (04/10/2022)
 Them Airs (04/29/2022)
 Weakened Friends (11/17/2022)
 Maude Latour (02/25/2023)
 Social House (02/25/2023)

Notable alumni
 Victor Fields, class of 1975 — jazz singer
 Cynthia McFadden, class of 1978 — co-anchor for the ABC television network’s Nightline and Primetime Live programs.
 Kary Antholis, class of 1984 — academy-award winning documentary filmmaker and vice president of HBO
 Steve Laffey, class of 1984 — mayor of Cranston, Rhode Island, from 2003 to 2007 — hosted a show entitled “The Joe Show” on WBOR.
 Joe Beninati, class of 1987 — ESPN and NBCSN sportscaster 
 Paul D. Miller, aka DJ Spooky, that Subliminal Kid, class of 1992 — DJ, electronic musician, composer, multimedia artist, author, and professor of music at the European Graduate School — hosted a show entitled “Dr. Seuss' Eclectic Jungle” on WBOR
 Matt Roberts, class of 1993 — Emmy-Winning writer for the 64th Annual Tony Awards, executive producer for the Late Show with David Letterman, head writer for the Late Late Show with James Corden.
 Jose Ayerve, class of 1996 — singer-songwriter, recording engineer, producer, and the frontman for northeast-based indie rock groups Spouse and Nuclear Waste Management Club
 Jennifer C. Lilly, class of 1996 — editor and production manager, known for Eighth Grade (2018), Master of None (2015)
 Nathan Michel, class of 1997 — composer, electronic musician, and multi-instrumentalist
 Michael J. Merenda Jr., class of 1998 — singer-songwriter, member of folk group the Mammals
 Hari Kondabolu, class of 2004 — stand-up comic, actor, and filmmaker
 Mirza Ramic, class of 2005 — electronic musician, member of the band Arms and Sleepers

References

External links
WBOR

BOR
Radio stations established in 1957
Organizations based in Brunswick, Maine
Bowdoin College